Mikouya is a village in south-eastern Gabon. It is located in the Mouloundou Department in Ogooué-Lolo Province and is situated near the Ogooué River.

Nearby towns and villages include Youlou (3.2 nm), Kera-Kera (1.0 nm), Mahouna (1.4 nm) and Malembe (1.0 nm).

Populated places in Ogooué-Lolo Province
Mouloundou Department